The 2022–23 The Citadel Bulldogs basketball team represented The Citadel, The Military College of South Carolina in the 2022–23 NCAA Division I men's basketball season. The Bulldogs played their home games at McAlister Field House in Charleston, South Carolina, as members of the Southern Conference.  The Citadel rehired head coach Ed Conroy for his second stint as head coach at his alma mater after the 2021–22 season.  This was his fifth season overall as head coach of the Bulldogs.

Previous season
The Bulldogs finished the season 13–18, 6–12 in SoCon play to finish in ninth place. The defeated East Tennessee State in the first round of the SoCon tournament before losing to Chattanooga in the quarterfinals.

On March 10, 2022, the school fired head coach Duggar Baucom. On March 23, the school named former Minnesota and Vanderbilt assistant Ed Conroy the team's new head coach. Conroy was the head coach of the Bulldogs from 2006 to 2010.

Roster

Schedule and results

|-
!colspan=9 style=| Exhibition

|-
!colspan=12 style=| Regular season

|-
!colspan=12 style=| SoCon tournament

Source

References

The Citadel Bulldogs basketball seasons
Citadel
Citadel Bulldogs basketball
Citadel Bulldogs basketball